Notopanisus is a genus of mites belonging to the family Hydryphantidae.

The species of this genus are found in Australia.

Species:

Notopanisus vinnulus

References

Acari